Aftantil Xanthopoulos (born 16 November 1971) is a Greek wrestler. He competed in the men's freestyle 97 kg at the 2000 Summer Olympics.

References

 

1971 births
Living people
Greek male sport wrestlers
Olympic wrestlers of Greece
Wrestlers at the 2000 Summer Olympics
Sportspeople from Kutaisi
20th-century Greek people